Tendo Dag (also spelled: Tindodag) (Pashto: تين دو ډاګ) is an administrative unit, known as Union council or Wards in Tehsil Babuzai, of Swat District in the Khyber Pakhtunkhwa province of Pakistan.

According to Khyber Pakhtunkhwa Local Government Act 2013. District Swat has 67 Wards, of which total amount of Village Councils is 170, and Neighbourhood Councils is 44.

Tendo Dag is Territorial Wards, which is further divided in two Village Councils:
 Gogdara (Village Council)
 Tindodag (Village Council)

See also 
 Babuzai
 Swat District

References

External links
Khyber-Pakhtunkhwa Government website section on Lower Dir
United Nations
Hajjinfo.org Uploads
 PBS paiman.jsi.com

Swat District
Populated places in Swat District
Union councils of Khyber Pakhtunkhwa
Union Councils of Swat District